France women's national softball team is the national team for France. The team competed at the 1994 ISF Women's World Championship in St. John's, Newfoundland where they finished twenty-first.

References

External links 
 International Softball Federation

Women's national softball teams
Women's national sports teams of France
Softball in France